Sochiapa is a municipality located in the central zone in the Mexican State of Veracruz, about 40 km from state capital Xalapa. It has a surface of 21.39 km2. It is located at .For decree of December 10, 1913 suprimió Sochiapa's municipality, passing its territory to form a part of that of Totutla; Later Sochiapa recovered its political category.

Geography

The municipality of Sochiapa is delimited to the north and northeast by Totutla, to the southeast by Comapa, to the south by Huatusco and to the west by Tlaltetela.  It is watered by small creeks which are tributaries of the Jamapa River.

Agriculture

It produces principally maize, coffee and sugarcane.

Celebrations

In  Sochiapa , in May takes place the celebration in honor to San Juan Nepomuseno, Patron of the town, and in December takes place the celebration in honor to Virgen de Guadalupe.

Weather

The weather in  Sochiapa  is cold  and wet all year with rains in summer and autumn.

References

External links 

  Municipal Official webpage
  Municipal Official Information

Municipalities of Veracruz